Calvin Thomas Bruton,  (born 29 September 1954) is an American-born Australian former professional basketball player and coach. He has been an integral part of the National Basketball League (NBL) since its inception. Bruton won an NBL championship with the Brisbane Bullets in 1985, was a two-time member of the All-NBL First Team while playing for the Geelong Supercats and was named NBL Coach of the Year while he was a player-coach for the Supercats in 1982. He also won a second NBL championship while coaching the Perth Wildcats in 1990. As a result, Bruton became one of the first inductees into the NBL Hall of Fame when it opened in 1998.

Originally an American import, Bruton became a naturalised Australian in 1983. He renounced his American citizenship to play for the Australia men's national basketball team in 1986. Bruton's son, C. J., played in the NBL and became successful in his own right.

Professional career
Bruton was a basketball playground legend from Jamaica, Queens in New York City. Bruton played his high school basketball at Springfield Gardens. Bruton was one of the first imports to play in the NBL, joining the Brisbane Bullets for the inaugural 1979 NBL season. Bruton led all scorers in the NBL's first year, averaging over 33.2 points per game.

Bruton later joined the Geelong Supercats in 1982 as a playing coach where he would win the NBL Coach of the Year in his first season. During his tenure with the Supercats, Bruton was also named to the All-NBL First Team in 1983 and 1984. As coach of Geelong, Bruton led the team to the 1982 NBL Grand Final where they were defeated 80–74 by the West Adelaide Bearcats at the Broadmeadow Basketball Stadium in Newcastle. In their 15 seasons of NBL competition from 1982 to 1996, this would prove to be Geelong's only NBL Grand Final appearance.

Bruton rejoined the Bullets in 1985 and helped them to their first NBL championship with a 121–95 win over the Adelaide 36ers. This success was followed in 1986 when the naturalised Bruton represented the Australian Boomers at the 1986 FIBA World Championship in Spain. After returning from Spain Bruton helped the Bullets into their fourth straight Grand Final where they would again face the Adelaide 36ers. For 1986 the NBL had extended the Grand Final to a best-of-three series. Game 1 was played in front of a record crowd of 11,000 at the Brisbane Entertainment Centre and saw a 122–119 win for Adelaide in overtime saw them overwhelming favourites (the 36ers had gone 24–2 during the season) to go home and wrap up the championship at the Apollo Stadium where they had an imposing 14–0 record up until that point of the season (and in fact had not lost since June 1985, a streak of 20 straight home wins). Brisbane, led by Bruton with 38 points, Ron Radliff and Larry Sengstock, stunned the 36ers with a 104–83 win to force a third and deciding game just two days later. Bruton's best friend off the court also happened to be Adelaide's point guard Al Green who was also a native of New York. The two, best friends off the court but the fiercest of rivals on it, had a running battle in Game 3 with Green eventually coming out on top leading Adelaide to a 113–91 victory for the 36ers' first NBL title. Bruton led all scorers, averaging 30.0 points, plus he had 3.3 assists per game over the Grand Final series.

Following the 1986 Grand Final series, Bruton had a public falling out with Bullets coach Brian Kerle and was sacked from the club under controversial circumstances. He was immediately snapped up as playing coach of perennial easy-beats the Perth Wildcats for the 1987 NBL season and immediately set about building a championship contending team. He recruited two players who would become stars with the Wildcats,  centre/power forwards James Crawford (a teammate of Bruton's at Geelong in 1982 known as the "Alabama Slamma" for his dunking ability) and former Harlem Globetrotter Kendal "Tiny" Pinder. As playing coach of the Wildcats Bruton built a team to beat the reigning NBL champions, the Adelaide 36ers. His plan paid off when the Wildcats defeated Adelaide 2–1 in the semi-finals (both wins were on Adelaide's home court where the 36ers had only lost twice during the season). Perth were unable to overcome Bruton's old team Brisbane and went down 2–0 in the Grand Final series.

Bruton played three seasons in Perth (two of which he shared playing and coaching duties), before becoming the head coach in 1990 in somewhat controversial circumstances. Alan Black was the head coach for the Wildcats at the beginning of the 1990 season, but after only two matches he was replaced by Bruton. Despite this eventful start to the season Bruton guided the Wildcats to its first NBL championship when they defeated the Brisbane Bullets (still coached by Kerle) 2–1 in the Grand Final series. Bruton himself was replaced the following year by Murray Arnold.

Cal sat out the 1991 NBL season, but returned in 1992 with another of the NBL's perennial easy-beats, the Hobart Devils. This would again later result in Bruton becoming the head coach for the Devils in their final season in 1996.

In the 1999–2000 NBL season, Bruton once again returned to coaching, this time for the Canberra Cannons. Like with the Hobart Devils, the Cannons were in financial difficulty at the time and their future was looking bleak. The 2002–03 season saw the financial difficulties of the Cannons reaching boiling point and it was announced their license would be sold. This series of events resulted in Bruton quitting the Cannons and not following the club in their move to Newcastle as the Hunter Pirates.

During the 2006–07 NBL season, Bruton was signed as interim head coach of the West Sydney Razorbacks, taking over in the middle of the season though he wasn't retained as coach for 2007–08.

Bruton now also helps out coaching for junior teams in his spare time, as a role model to the junior basketball players.

He was also once in a celebrity episode of 1980s gameshow It's a Knockout where he dressed in a horse suit alongside Big Sports Breakfast co-host and journalist Terry Kennedy.

Bruton was awarded an Order of Australia Medal (OAM) in the 2021 Australia Day Honours, for "For service to basketball as a player and coach."

Honour roll

NBL career stats

References

External links
Cal Bruton at ozhoopsalmanac.com

1954 births
Living people
African-American basketball players
American emigrants to Australia
American expatriate basketball people in Australia
American men's basketball players
Australian men's basketball players
Basketball players from New York City
Brisbane Bullets players
Geelong Supercats players
Hobart Devils players
Perth Wildcats players
Point guards
National Basketball League (Australia) coaches
Wichita State Shockers men's basketball players
1986 FIBA World Championship players
21st-century African-American people
20th-century African-American sportspeople